King Vulikhaya kaXolilizwe (Ahlangene Cyprian Sigcawu) is the King of Xhosa people. He was born in 1970 in Nqadu Great Place in Willowvale by King Xolilizwe Sigcawu and Queen Nogaweni. He took over as the King in 2020 after the death of caretaker Xhosa King INkosi Nongudle Dumehleli Mapasa who took over following the death of his brother King Zwelonke Sigcawu in 2019. He was a South African High Commissioner to Malawi before he could ascend the throne as the Xhosa King.

Life

King Ahlangene Cyprian Vulikhaya Sigcawu "Aa! Vulikhaya!" ascended the throne of Xhosa Kingdom in 2020 after a year of his brother's death King Zwelonke Sigcawu in 2019.

References

Living people
People from the Eastern Cape
1970 births